The coat of arms of Norfolk Island is the official symbol of the island and external Australian territory of Norfolk Island. It was granted by a Royal Warrant of Queen Elizabeth II on 20 October 1980.

The blazon of the Arms is: Per chevron Azure and Argent in chief two Mullets of the last and in base issuant from a Rocky Mount charged with a Book expanded proper edged Or leathered Gules a Norfolk Island Pine proper; And for Crest: Out of a Naval Crown Azure a demi-lion Or gorged with a laurel wreath proper and holding a covered cup Or; And for Supporters: On the dexter side a Lion and on the sinister side a Kangaroo proper each resting the exterior foreleg on an Anchor erect Azure; And for the Compartment: a motto "INASMUCH"

The motto INASMUCH comes from the song Come Ye Blessed, a local anthem.

See also

 Flag of Norfolk Island
 Australian heraldry

References

Norfolk Island
Norfolk Island
Norfolk Island
Norfolk Island
Norfolk Island
Norfolk Island
Norfolk Island
1980 establishments in Australia